The Call of Cthulhu is a 2005 independent silent film adaptation of the H. P. Lovecraft short story "The Call of Cthulhu", produced by Sean Branney and Andrew Leman and distributed by the H. P. Lovecraft Historical Society. It is the first film adaptation of the famous Lovecraft story, and uses Mythoscope, a blend of vintage and modern filming techniques intended to produce the look of a 1920s-era film. The film is the length of a featurette.

The original story had long been considered unfilmable, but the conceit of making it a silent film and the enthusiasm that the creators had for their project earned it good reviews and several awards.

Plot
The film begins with a dying professor who leaves his great-nephew a collection of documents pertaining to the Cthulhu Cult. The nephew (Matt Foyer) begins to learn why the study of the cult so fascinated his grandfather. Bit-by-bit he begins piecing together the dread implications of his grandfather's inquiries, and soon he takes on investigating the Cthulhu cult as a crusade of his own. Sailors aboard the Emma encounter the Alert abandoned at sea. The nephew notes that Inspector Legrasse, who had directed the raid on cultists in backwoods Louisiana, died before the nephew's investigation began. As he pieces together the dreadful and disturbing reality of the situation, his own sanity begins to crumble. In the end, he passes the torch to his psychiatrist, who in turn hears Cthulhu's call.

Cast
Matt Foyer as Francis Wayland Thurston
John Bolen as The Listener
Ralph Lucas as Professor Angell
Chad Fifer as Henry Wilcox
David Mersault as Inspector Legrasse
Barry Lynch as Professor Webb

Release
The Call of Cthulhu was selected to appear at numerous film festivals, including the 2006 Slamdance Film Festival and North America's largest, the 2006 Seattle International Film Festival, where it sold out both screenings thanks in part to a glowing review from The Stranger, a local paper.

Reception
Despite the long-standing conventional wisdom that the story was inherently "unfilmable", The Call of Cthulhu garnered mostly positive reception from critics. It holds 100% approval rating on Rotten Tomatoes with an average rating of 7.1/10  based on 6 reviews.

Dennis Schwartz from Ozus' World Movie Reviews rated the film a grade B, writing, "[a] haunting labor of love tribute", praising the film's style, and score.
Paul di Filippo of Science Fiction Weekly called it "the best HPL adaptation to date", labeling the decision to adapt it as a silent film "a brilliant conceit". Daniel Siwek from DVD Talk gave the film 4.5 out of 5 stars, calling it "very eerie and enjoyable", and A true testament to what can be accomplished with a lot of work and passion, but with limited funds." DW Bostaph Jr from Dread Central awarded the film a score of 4/5, writing, "Ambitious in its own right, The Call of Cthulhu is indeed a step forward for the world of H. P. Lovecraft cinema. It is one of a handful of new films made by fans of the late great authors work, who not only see the prospect in the mines, but are able to understand the rock they are hidden within". David Cornelius from eFilmCritic gave the film 4 out of 5 stars, praising the film's soundtrack, writing, "What's truly great about Cthulhu is that it not only sets out to impress the hardcore Lovecraft fanatic, but fans of classic and/or experimental independent film as well. While it stumbles in places, both in terms of storytelling and presentation of its gimmick, it's such a unique project, and the love for the project by all involved is so contagious, that it becomes one of those special hidden secrets that you can't wait to introduce to your friends."

In their book Lurker in the Lobby: The Guide to the Cinema of H. P. Lovecraft, Andrew Migliore and John Strysik write: "The Call of Cthulhu is a landmark adaptation that calls out to all Lovecraftian film fanatics — from its silent film form, its excellent cast, its direction, and its wonderful musical score... this is Cthulhuian cinema that Howard would have loved."

Awards
The Call of Cthulhu received various awards, including:
 Best Feature at Eerie Horror Film Festival (2006)
 Prix Tournage for the Best American Movie at 23rd Avignon Film Festival (2006)
 Audience Choice at Another Hole in the Head (2006)
 Vuze Audience Favorites Winner (2007/2008)

References

External links
 
 
 
 

2005 films
2005 horror films
American supernatural horror films
American silent feature films
2000s English-language films
American black-and-white films
Cthulhu Mythos films
Direct-to-video horror films
Films set in the 1870s
Films set in 1907
Films set in 1908
Films set in 1925
Films set in 1926
Films set in Greenland
Films set in Sydney
Films set in New Orleans
Films set in Norway
Films set in New Zealand
Films set in Rhode Island
Films shot in California
Films shot in Rhode Island
American nonlinear narrative films
2005 short films
Horror featurettes
American independent films
Works based on The Call of Cthulhu
2000s American films
Silent horror films